is a Japanese shōjo manga series written and illustrated by Yuki Shiraishi and serialized in Shogakukan's Sho-Comi manga magazine.

Media

Manga

Live-action

A live-action film has been announced to release in 2018.

Ryo Yoshizawa, Yuko Araki and Yosuke Sugino starred in the film, directed by Ryô Miyawaki and was released on 5 October 2018 in Japan.

References

External links
 

Shōjo manga
Shogakukan manga
Romance anime and manga